n-Hexyllithium, C6H13Li, sometimes abbreviated to HxLi or NHL, is an organolithium compound used in organic synthesis as a strong base or as a lithiation reagent.  It is usually encountered as a colorless or pale yellow solution in hexanes.  Such solutions are highly sensitive to air and can ignite when treated with water.

In terms of chemical properties, hexyllithium and n-butyllithium (BuLi) are very similar. As a base, hexyllithium generates n-hexane as a byproduct rather than gaseous  butane, which results from the use of BuLi.  Another advantage for HxLi is that it is slightly less reactive. Both of these aspects encourage industrial applications. It is commercially available as a solution in mixed hexanes, usually at a concentration of about 2 M for laboratory use or 33% for industrial use.

As for BuLi, the structure and formula for HxLi are often depicted as a monomer.  Like all organolithium compounds, it exists as clusters in solution and as a solid.

Notes and references

Notes

References

Organolithium compounds
Reagents for organic chemistry